Vrančice is a municipality and village in Příbram District in the Central Bohemian Region of the Czech Republic. It has about 200 inhabitants.

Administrative parts
Villages of Mýšlovice and Životice are administrative parts of Vrančice.

References

Villages in Příbram District